Reagan Jae Pasternak (born March 8, 1977) is a Canadian actress known for her role as Julianne in the TV series Being Erica.

Biography
Pasternak was born in Toronto, Ontario. She is the youngest of four. She has two older sisters and an older brother. She is also a singer, and has won numerous awards and scholarships for her music. In 2003 she was nominated for a Gemini for her performance of Zelda Fitzgerald in Hemingway vs. Callaghan.

Filmography

Film

Television

References

External links
 
 TV.com's summary on Reagan Pasternak

1977 births
Actresses from Toronto
Canadian television actresses
Living people
Canadian film actresses
20th-century Canadian actresses
21st-century Canadian actresses